Jennifer Martin may refer to:

 Jennifer H. Martin, Australian pharmacologist
 Jennifer L. Martin, Australian molecular biologist